Matthew Edward Keneley (born December 1, 1973) is a former American football defensive tackle. He played for the San Francisco 49ers in 1999 and for the Los Angeles Xtreme in 2001.

References

1973 births
Living people
American football defensive tackles
USC Trojans football players
San Francisco 49ers players
Los Angeles Xtreme players